Barry Links railway station lies south of the village of Barry, west of Carnoustie in Angus, Scotland. It is sited  from the former Dundee East station, and is on the Dundee to Aberdeen line, between Monifieth and Golf Street. The station is managed by ScotRail, who provide all the services at the station.

In 2016/17, Barry Links was the least used railway station in the UK with just 24 entries and exits.

History 

The station was opened on 31 July 1851 by Dundee and Arbroath Railway, and was named Barry. The station was renamed to its current name on 1 April 1919, presumably to avoid confusion with Barry station, in South Wales.

Facilities 
Both platforms have shelters and benches, whilst platform 2 also has cycle racks. Only platform 2 has step-free access. As there are no facilities to purchase tickets, passengers must buy one in advance, or from the guard on the train.

Passenger volume
In the 2011/12 statistics, Barry Links had the seventh lowest passenger numbers. The low numbers reflect the fact that the service was very sparse at the time. In the 2016/17 statistics, Barry Links again became the least used station in Britain, receiving only 24 entries and exits.

In March 2019, ScotRail apologized for previous poor services across the network and offered season ticket holders, on affected routes, unlimited travel anywhere on the ScotRail network for selected weekends in March–May 2019. This then meant passengers were to buy the cheapest season ticket available between Golf Street and Barry Links, in order to take advantage of this promotion. As a result, the year 2019/20 saw a massive increase in passenger entries/exits to the station.

The statistics cover twelve month periods that start in April.

Services 
As of May 2022, there is a total of four trains per day (two in each direction): southbound, there is an 06:18 to Dundee and an 07:54 to Glasgow Queen Street, whilst northbound there is an 18:11 and an 18:48, both to Arbroath. There is no Sunday service.

References

Bibliography

External Links 

 Video footage of the station on YouTube

Railway stations in Angus, Scotland
Former Dundee and Arbroath Railway stations
Railway stations in Great Britain opened in 1851
Railway stations served by ScotRail
Low usage railway stations in the United Kingdom
1851 establishments in Scotland